Creodonta ("meat teeth") is a former order of extinct carnivorous placental mammals that lived from the early Paleocene to the late Miocene epochs in North America, Europe, Asia and Africa. Originally thought to be a single group of animals ancestral to the modern Carnivora, this order is now usually considered a polyphyletic assemblage of two different groups, the Oxyaenids and the Hyenodonts, not a natural group. Oxyaenids are first known from the Palaeocene of North America, while hyaenodonts hail from the Palaeocene of Africa. 

The first large, obviously carnivorous mammals appeared with the radiation of the oxyaenids in the late Paleocene. During the Paleogene, "creodont" species were the most abundant terrestrial carnivores in the Old World. In Oligocene Africa, hyaenodonts were the dominant group of large flesh-eaters, persisting until the middle of the Miocene. 

"Creodont" groups had an extensive range, both geographically and temporally. They are known from the late Paleocene through the late Oligocene in North America, the early Eocene through late Oligocene in Europe, from the late Paleocene through late Miocene in Asia, and from the late Paleocene to the late Miocene in Africa. While most were small-to-medium sized mammals, among their number was Sarkastodon, one of the largest mammalian land predators of all time, weighing an estimated 800 kg. 

The decline of the hyaenodonts coincides in time with the rise of the Carnivora, but it is unclear whether these events were related (i.e., carnivorans outcompeted "creodonts") or whether they are two separate results of environmental factors.

Most modern paleontologists agree both "creodont" families are related to Carnivora, but are not their direct ancestors. It is still unclear how closely the two families are related to each other. In general, classification is complicated by the fact that relationships among fossil mammals are usually decided by similarities in the teeth, but the teeth of hypercarnivorous species may evolve similar shapes through convergent evolution, to deal with the mechanics of eating meat.

"Creodonts" share with the Carnivora, and many other predatory mammal clades, the carnassial shear, a scissors-like modification of upper and lower cheek teeth that was used to slice muscle tissue. This adaptation is also seen in other clades of predatory mammals.

Systematics and history
"Creodonta" was coined by Edward Drinker Cope in 1875. Cope included the oxyaenids and the viverravid Didymictis but omitted the Hyaenodontidae. In 1880. he expanded the term to include families Miacidae (including Viverravidae), Arctocyonidae, Leptictidae (now Pseudorhyncocyonidae), Oxyaenidae, Ambloctonidae and Mesonychidae. Cope originally placed creodonts within the Insectivora. In 1884, however, he regarded them as a basal group from which both carnivorans and insectivorans arose.

Hyaenodontidae was not included among the creodonts until 1909. William Diller Matthew regarded Creodonta as a suborder of order Carnivora, divided in three groups:
 "Inadaptive Creodonta" (Creodonta inadaptiva), group that includes "Pseudocreodi" (oxyaenids and hyaenodontids) and the mesonychids,
 "Adaptive Creodonta" (Creodonta adaptiva), made up of the miacids and the taxa included in the wastebasket "Arctocyonidae",
 and "Primitive Creodonta" (Creodonta primitiva), made up of Oxyclaenidae.

Over time, various groups and species were removed from this order. It stabilized in the mid-20th century as representing oxyaenids, hyaenodonts, mesonychids, and arctocyonids, which were understood as the major groups of flesh-eating placental mammals that were not members of the Carnivora. It became increasingly clear that arctocyonids were a wastebasket taxon and mesonychids might be more closely related to ungulates. By 1969, Creodonta contained only the oxyaenids and the hyaenodontids.

More recently, "Creodonta" had been considered to be a nonvalid polyphyletic assemblage of carnivorous placental mammals (and not a natural group), and members of Creodonta being sister taxa to Carnivoramorpha (carnivorans and their stem-relatives) within clade Pan-Carnivora (in mirorder Ferae), split in two groups: order Oxyaenodonta as one group and order Hyaenodonta plus its stem-relatives (genera Altacreodus and Tinerhodon) in the other. However, some phylogenetic analysis recover them as a natural group, such as a phylogenetic analysis of Paleocene mammals published in 2015 that supported the monophyly of Creodonta, and placed the group as relatives of clade Pholidotamorpha (pangolins and their stem-relatives).

Polly has argued that the only available synapomorphy between oxyaenids and hyaenodontids is a large metastylar blade on the first molar (M1), but he believes that that feature is common for all basal eutheria. Separating Oxyaenidae from Hyaenodontidae would also comport with biogeographic evidence, since the first oxyaenid is known from the North American early Paleocene and the first hyaenodontids are from very late Paleocene of North Africa.

Complicating this arrangement is the tentative endorsement by Gunnell of the erection of a third family, Limnocyonidae. The group includes taxa that were once considered oxyaenids, such as Limnocyon, Thinocyon and Prolimnocyon. Wortman had even erected a subfamily of Limnocyoninae within the oxyaenids. Van Valen nests the same subfamily (including Oxyaenodon) within Hyaenodontidae. Gunnell is agnostic whether Limnocyonidae is a group within Hyaenodontidae (although a sister group to the rest of hyaenodontids) or entirely separate.

According to Gunnell, the defining features of the oxyaenids include: A small braincase low in the skull. The occiput wide at base and narrowing dorsally (to give it a triangular shape). The lacrimal bone makes a semicircular expansion on the face. The mandibles have heavy symphysis. M1 and m2 form the carnassials, while M3/m3 are absent. The manus and pes are plantigrade or subplantigrade. The fibula articulates with the calcaneum, and the astragalus articulates with the cuboid bone. The phalanges are compressed and fissured at the tip.

Likewise, Gunnell's list of defining features of hyaenodontids includes: Long, narrow skull with a narrow basicranium and a high narrow occiput. The frontal bones are concave between the orbital regions. M2 and m3 form the carnassials. M3 is present in most species, while m3 is always present. Manus and pes range from plantigrade to digitigrade. The fibula articulates with the calcaneum, while the astragalar-cuboid articulation is reduced or absent. Terminal phalanges are compressed and fissured at the tip.

The limnocyonids had the following features according to Gunnell: M3/m3 were reduced or absent, other teeth were unreduced. The rostrum was elongated. The animals themselves were small to medium-sized.

Morphology

Dentition
The canines are always large and pointed. The lateral incisors are large, while the medial incisors are usually small. Premolars are primitive, with one primary cusp and various secondary cusps.

Creodonts have two or three pairs of carnassial teeth. One pair performed the largest cutting function (either M1/m2 or M2/m3). This arrangement is unlike modern carnivorans, which use P4 and m1 for carnassials. This difference suggests convergent evolution among meat-eaters, with a separate evolutionary history and an order-level distinction, given that different teeth evolved as the carnassials both between creodonts and carnivorans, and between oxyaenids and hyenodonts. Carnassials are also known in other flesh-eating mammal clades, such as in the extinct bat Necromantis, as well as highly unrelated taxa such as the flesh-eating marsupial Thylacoleo.

Different molars were involved in the two major groups of creodonts. In the Oxyaenidae, M1 and m2 that form the carnassials. Among the hyaenodontids, it is M2 and m3. Unlike most modern carnivorans, in which the carnassials are the sole shearing teeth, other creodont molars have a subordinate shearing functions. The difference in which teeth form the carnassials is a major argument for the polyphyly of Creodonta.

Cranium
Creodonts had long, narrow skulls with small brains. The skull narrowed considerably behind the eyes, producing a distinct splanchnocranium and neurocranium segments of the cranium. They had large sagittal crests and usually broad mastoids (which were probably derived features for the group). Many creodonts had proportionately large heads. In primitive forms, the auditory bullae was not ossified. Generally the temporal fossae were very broad.

Postcranial skeleton
Creodonts had generalized postcranial skeletons. Their limbs were mesaxonic (with the axis of the foot provided by the middle of their five digits). Their method of locomotion ranged from plantigrade to digitigrade. The terminal phalanges were fused claws.

Size
Creodonts ranged in size from the size of a small cat to the  Sarkastodon. The larger animals, however, were not known until late in the Paleocene with the radiation of the oxyaenids, such as the puma-sized Dipsalidictis and the probably bone-crushing scavenger Dipsalodon.

Certain creodonts (Arfia, Prolimnocyon and Palaeonictis) seem to have experienced the dwarfing phenomenon during the Paleocene-Eocene Thermal Maximum seen in other mammal genera. A proposed explanation for this phenomenon is that the increased carbon dioxide levels in the atmosphere directly affected carnivores through increased temperature and aridity and also indirectly affected them by reducing the size of their herbivorous prey through the same selective pressures.

The largest North American creodont is Patriofelis. A specimen of P. ferox collected in the Bridger Basin of southern Wyoming was the size of a full-grown black bear with a head almost the size of an adult male lion.

During the Central Asia Expedition of 1930 by the American Museum of Natural History, the largest creodont ever discovered was collected: Sarkastodon mongoliensis. Its dimensions were described as 50% greater than the Patriofelis to which it bore many similarities. It has been estimated that Sarkastodon attained the body mass of twice the largest American lion.

Biology

Diet and feeding
Early creodonts (both oxyaenids and hyaenodontids) displayed the tribosphenic molars common for basal therians. Small forms had somewhat strong postmetacrista-metastellar crests suggesting that they were probably opportunistic feeders, eating such things as eggs, birds, small mammals, insects and possibly plant matter as well, possibly like extant viverrids. Larger forms had greater shearing capacity and the capacity increased over time. Arfia, one of the most common carnivorous mammals in early Eocene North America, developed a more open trigonid on M3 over the course of the Early Eocene, increasing the shearing ability of the carnassials. A similar development can be seen by comparing Oxyaena, Prototomus and Limnocyon with the smaller, more generalized feeders among the creodonts.

Extinction
Several theories have suggested that hyaenodonts and oxyaenids became extinct because they were outcompeted by the newly-evolved Carnivora. However, there is no direct evidence that the existence of large Carnivora caused the extinction of these taxa, and in some cases (for instance in Africa), hyaenodonts thrived in environments in which large carnivorans were also present. Theories that suggest they were outcompeted by the Carnivora include that their smaller brains limited their intelligence. Other speculations focus on their limb structure, which limited leg movement to a vertical plane, as in ungulates; they were unable to turn their wrists and forearms inward to trip, slash, or grab prey as modern carnivores can. Creodonts had to depend entirely on their jaws to capture prey, which may be why creodonts generally had a larger head size in relation to their bodies than carnivores of similar stature. In the Carnivora, the last upper premolar and the first lower molar are the carnassials, allowing the rearmost molar teeth to evolve adaptations for feeding on non-meat foods. In creodonts, either the first upper and second lower molars, or the second upper and third lower molars, were the primary carnassials, and the rear teeth formed a carnassial series. This structure committed them to eating meat almost exclusively, which may have limited their ability to exploit mesocarnivore and omnivore ecological niches. These differences may have caused environmental changes to affect hyaenodonts and oxyaenids differently than modern carnivores.

References

Further reading
 

Cenozoic mammals of Europe
Obsolete mammal taxa
Tortonian extinctions
Paleocene first appearances
Fossil taxa described in 1875